Yury Leontyev (born 14 August 1961) is a Russian archer. He competed at the 1988 Summer Olympics and the 2000 Summer Olympics.

References

External links
 

1961 births
Living people
Russian male archers
Olympic archers of the Soviet Union
Olympic archers of Russia
Archers at the 1988 Summer Olympics
Archers at the 2000 Summer Olympics
People from Cheboksary
Sportspeople from Chuvashia